Emanual Davis (born August 27, 1968) is a retired American professional basketball player. As a 6'4" (1.96 m) point guard, Davis played college basketball at Delaware State University in Dover, Delaware. Davis was never drafted by a National Basketball Association team, and played in the Continental Basketball Association, Italian Basketball League, United States Basketball League and the Atlantic Basketball Association in a span of 5 years before making it into the NBA. Davis played in 6 NBA seasons from 1996 to 1998 and 1999–2003. He played for the Houston Rockets, Seattle SuperSonics and Atlanta Hawks.

In his NBA career, Davis played in 227 games and scored a total of 1,100 points, averaging 4.9 points a game.

External links
NBA stats @ basketballreference.com
Bio at NBA.com

1968 births
Living people
American expatriate basketball people in France
American expatriate basketball people in Greece
American expatriate basketball people in Italy
American men's basketball players
Atlanta Hawks players
Basket Rimini Crabs players
Delaware State Hornets men's basketball players
Élan Béarnais players
Houston Rockets players
Panionios B.C. players
Point guards
Rockford Lightning players
Seattle SuperSonics players
Shooting guards
Undrafted National Basketball Association players
Yakima Sun Kings players
Basketball players from Philadelphia